Trubatsa is a genus of sea snails, marine gastropod mollusks in the family Muricidae, the murex snails or rock snails.

Species
 Trubatsa alinkios Houart, Buge & Zuccon, 2021
 Trubatsa longicornis (Dall, 1888)
 Trubatsa lozoueti (Houart, 1991)
 † Trubatsa parisiensis (d’Orbigny, 1850) 
 Trubatsa patera Garrigues, 2021
 Trubatsa saltantis (Houart, 1991)
 Trubatsa tityrus (Bayer, 1971)
 Trubatsa undulata (Houart, 1991)
 Trubatsa unicornis (Houart, 1991)
 Trubatsa virginiae (Houart, 1986)
 Trubatsa wolffi (Houart, 2013)

References

 Houart, R, Buge, B. & Zuccon, D. (2021). A taxonomic update of the Typhinae (Gastropoda: Muricidae) with a review of New Caledonia species and the description of new species from New Caledonia, the South China Sea and Western Australia. Journal of Conchology. 44(2): 103–147.
 Garrigues, B. (2021). Description of four new Typhinae species (Mollusca: Muricidae) and comments on the status of the genus Talityphis Jousseaume, 1882 and Trubatsa Dall, 1889. Xenophora Taxonomy. 33: 3-20.

External links

 Dall, W. H. (1889). Reports on the results of dredging, under the supervision of Alexander Agassiz, in the Gulf of Mexico (1877-78) and in the Caribbean Sea (1879-80), by the U.S. Coast Survey Steamer "Blake", Lieut.-Commander C.D. Sigsbee, U.S.N., and Commander J.R. Bartlett, U.S.N., commanding. XXIX. Report on the Mollusca. Part 2, Gastropoda and Scaphopoda. Bulletin of the Museum of Comparative Zoölogy at Harvard College. 18: 1-492, pls. 10-40.

 
Typhinae